Finnrevet is a Swedish lighthouse located on  a shoal about  outside Oskarshamn in Europe.

General information
The lighthouse was built in 1921 and is located on a reef just east of island Furö.

Wrecks near Finnrevet
The waters around island Furön are shallow and many ships have run aground in the area near the lighthouse.

Shipwrecks in the area:

 Schooner Charlotta wrecked east of Finnrevet 17 May 1882 in a northern gale.
 Russian schooner Lotus av Libau ran aground here in 1898.
 S/S Britkon, cargoship, built 1917 in Sunderland, beached at Finnrevet in November 1949. The steamship had a length of 109 meters, and broke in half after about one month grounded at the reef. The 37 men-crew were rescued by maritime pilots stationed on the nearby island Furön.
 The Hans Olof was a Swedish ship grounded at the reef in due to a sudden north-eastern gale in 1950.
 M/S Priwall, West German flagged cargoship beached at Finnrevet February 1, 1968 loaded with wooden goods.

See also

 List of lighthouses and lightvessels in Sweden

References

External links
 Sjofartsverket 
 The Swedish Lighthouse Society

Lighthouses completed in 1921
Lighthouses in Sweden
Oskarshamn